Puteri Munajjah Az-Zahraa binti Azhar (born 2001) is a Malaysian chess player who holds the FIDE title of Woman International Master (2019), making her the third Malaysian to earn that title, after Audrey Wong Su Yi (1985) and  (2006).

Chess career
In 2019, she won the girls Under 16&18 category at the 4th  Eastern Asian Youth Chess Championship in Bangkok, scoring 7½/9, becoming the third Malaysian WIM.

She qualified for the Women's Chess World Cup 2021, where she was defeated 1½-½ by Ana Matnadze in the first round.

References

External links

2001 births
Living people
Malaysian chess players
Chess Woman International Masters